Stakhanov Ferroalloy Plant is the largest (about 50% of all-Ukrainian production) plant for the production of ferrosilicon in Ukraine. The plant is located in the city of Stakhanov, Luhansk Oblast, Ukraine. It is located on uncontrolled territory.

History
The decision to start construction was made in 1952. Construction took place during 1959-1962. The plant has eight ferroalloy furnaces with a capacity of about 2,000 tons per month each. The main products are: ferrosilicon, ferromanganese, and ferrosilicon manganese. Most of the company's products (about 75%) were exported from Ukraine. 

In 2011, SFP reduced the production of ferroalloys by 5.2% compared to 2010 - to 208.3 thousand tons. At the same time, the plant increased the production of ferrosilicon (in terms of 45%) by 6.8% - to 145.3 thousand tons, but reduced the production of silico-manganese - by 24.7% to 63 thousand tons. 

By the end of 2011, four Cypriot companies: Philex Investments Limited, Felicio Enterprises Limited, Kellton Enterprises Limited and Mercliston Limited, owned 24.4867% each, for a total of 97.9468% of SFP. The business of Stakhanov FP, Zaporizhzhia Ferroalloy Plant, Ordzhonikidze and Marhanets mining and processing plants is organized by PrivateBank (Dnipropetrovsk). Delivery of products was carried out to Alchevsk Metallurgical Complex. 

In 2018 during the russian occupation, the plant came under the external management of the South Ossetian company "Vneshtorgservice" run by Vladimir Pashkov and was named "branch № 13" Stakhanov Ferroalloy Plant of  "Vneshtorgservice."

Products
 Ferrosilicon
 Ferrosilicon manganese
 Ferromanganese
 Electrode mass (Anode paste)
 Slag

References

History of Luhansk Oblast
1961 in Ukraine
Economy of Luhansk Oblast
Stakhanov, Ukraine
Economy of Ukraine by city
Companies of Ukraine by city
Steel companies of Ukraine
Companies established in 1961